Siwinqani (Aymara siwinqa a kind of cactus, -ni a suffix, "the one with the siwinqa plant", also spelled Sehuencani) is a mountain in the Bolivian Andes which reaches a height of approximately  high . It is located in the Cochabamba Department, Arque Province, Arque Municipality.

References 

Mountains of Cochabamba Department